United States gubernatorial elections were held in November 1967, in three states.

In Kentucky, Ned Breathitt wasn't allowed to run for a second term under the term limits rule at the time, a rule that was changed in 1992.

In Mississippi, Paul B. Johnson Jr. was also not eligible to run for a second term, a rule that was changed in the mid-1980s.

In Louisiana, John McKeithen was the first governor to serve two consecutive terms after an amendment to the Louisiana Constitution was passed on November 8, 1966.  The primary for his second term was on November 4, 1967, and the actual election was on February 6, 1968, with no Republican opposition.

References

 
November 1967 events in the United States